Since March 2018, passive euthanasia is legal in India under strict guidelines. Patients must consent through a living will, and must be either terminally ill or in a vegetative state.

Court verdicts on Euthanasia 
On 9 March 2018 the Supreme Court of India legalised passive euthanasia by means of the withdrawal of life support to patients in a permanent vegetative state. The decision was made as part of the verdict in a case involving Aruna Shanbaug, who had been in a Persistent Vegetative State (PVS) until her death in 2015.

On 9 March 2018, the Supreme Court of India, passed a historic judgement-law permitting Passive Euthanasia in the country. This judgment was passed in wake of Pinki Virani's plea to the Supreme Court in December 2009 under the Constitutional provision of “Next Friend”. It is a landmark law which places the power of choice in the hands of the individual, over government, medical or religious control which sees all suffering as “destiny”. The Supreme Court specified two irreversible conditions to permit Passive Euthanasia Law in its 2011 Law: (I) The brain-dead for whom the ventilator can be switched off (II) Those in a Persistent Vegetative State (PVS) for whom the feed can be tapered out and pain-managing palliatives be added, according to laid-down international specifications.

The same judgement-law also asked for the scrapping of 309, the code which penalises those who survive suicide-attempts. In December 2014, government of India declared its intention to do so.

However, on 25 February 2014, a three-judge bench of Supreme Court of India had termed the judgment in the Aruna Shanbaug case to be 'inconsistent in itself' and has referred the issue of euthanasia to its five-judge Constitution bench.

And on 23 December 2014, Government of India endorsed and re-validated the Passive Euthanasia judgement-law in a Press Release, after stating in the Rajya Sabha as follows: that The Hon'ble Supreme Court of India in its judgment dated 7.3.2011 [WP (Criminal) No. 115 of 2009], while dismissing the plea for mercy killing in a particular case, laid down comprehensive guidelines to process cases relating to passive euthanasia. Thereafter, the matter of mercy killing was examined in consultation with the Ministry of Law and Justice and it has been decided that since the Hon'ble Supreme Court has already laid down the guidelines, these should be followed and treated as law in such cases. At present, there is no proposal to enact legislation on this subject and the judgment of the Hon'ble Supreme Court is binding on all. The Health Minister, J P Nadda stated this in a written reply in the Rajya Sabha.

The high court rejected active euthanasia by means of lethal injection. In the absence of a law regulating euthanasia in India, the court stated that its decision becomes the law of the land until the Indian parliament enacts a suitable law. Active euthanasia, including the administration of lethal compounds for the purpose of ending life, is still illegal in India, and in most countries.

In 2018 the Supreme Court of India declared through a five-judge Constitution bench that, if strict guidelines are followed, the government would honor "living wills" allowing consenting patients to be passively euthanized if the patient suffers from a terminal illness or is in a vegetative state. 
Before euthanasia became practicable in India, there existed the possibility of signing a leaving against medical advice (LAMA) which transferred from the physician to the patient the full responsibility for the discontinuation of his living therapies.

Aruna Shanbaug case

Aruna Shanbaug was a nurse working at the King Edward Memorial Hospital, Parel, Mumbai. On 27 November 1973 she was strangled and sodomized by Sohanlal Walmiki, a sweeper. During the attack she was strangled with a chain, and the deprivation of oxygen left her in a vegetative state. On behalf of Aruna, her friend Pinki Virani, a social activist, filed a petition in the Supreme Court arguing that the "continued existence of Aruna is in violation of her right to live in dignity". The Supreme Court made its decision on 7 March 2011. The court rejected the plea to discontinue Aruna's life support but issued a set of broad guidelines legalising passive euthanasia in India. The Supreme Court's decision to reject the discontinuation of Aruna's life support was based on the fact that the hospital staff who treat and take care of her did not support euthanizing her. Aruna died from pneumonia on 18 May 2015, after being in a coma for a period of 42 years.

Supreme Court decision
While rejecting Pinki Virani's plea for Aruna Shanbaug's euthanasia, the court laid out guidelines for passive euthanasia. According to these guidelines, passive euthanasia involves the withdrawing of treatment or food that would allow the patient to live. Forms of active euthanasia, including the administration of lethal compounds, legal in a number of nations and jurisdictions including Luxemburg, Belgium and the Netherlands, as well as the US states of Washington and Oregon, are still illegal in India.

Elsewhere in the world active euthanasia is almost always illegal. The legal status of passive euthanasia, on the other hand, including the withdrawal of nutrition or water, varies across the nations of the world. As India had no law about euthanasia, the Supreme Court's guidelines are law until and unless Parliament passes legislation. India's Minister of Law and Justice, Veerappa Moily, called for serious political debate over the issue. The following guidelines were laid down:
 A decision has to be taken to discontinue life support either by the parents or the spouse or other close relatives, or in the absence of any of them, such a decision can be taken even by a person or a body of persons acting as a next friend. It can also be taken by the doctors attending the patient. However, the decision should be taken bona fide in the best interest of the patient.
 Even if a decision is taken by the near relatives or doctors or next friend to withdraw life support, such a decision requires presence of two witness and countersigned by first class judicial magistrate, and should also be approved by a medical board set up by the hospital.

 Reference to Constitution Bench 
On 25 February 2014, while hearing a PIL filed by NGO Common Cause, a three-judge bench of the Supreme Court of India observed that the judgment in Aruna Shanbaug case was based on a wrong interpretation of the constitution bench judgment in Gian Kaur v. State of Punjab. Court observed that the judgment in inconsistent in itself as though it observes that euthanasia can be allowed only by legislature yet it goes on to lay down guidelines on the same. Therefore, court has referred the issue to a constitution bench which shall be heard by a strength of at least five judges. Court observed:In view of the inconsistent opinions rendered in Aruna Shanbaug (supra) and also considering the important question of law involved which needs to be reflected in the light of social, legal, medical and constitutional perspective, it becomes extremely important to have a clear enunciation of law. Thus, in our cogent opinion, the question of law involved requires careful consideration by a Constitution Bench of this Court for the benefit of humanity as a whole.The Five-Judge Bench of the Supreme Court was tasked with deciding whether Article 21 of the Constitution includes in its ambit the right to die with dignity by means of executing a living wills/advance directives.

Response
After the court ruling The Telegraph consulted with Muslim, Hindu, Jain and Christian religious leaders. Though generally against legalising euthanasia, Christians and the Jains thought passive euthanasia was acceptable under some circumstances. Jains and Hindus have the traditional rituals Santhara and Prayopavesa respectively, wherein one fasts unto death. The Jain vow of sallekhanā or santhara, is observed by the Jains only in special circumstances. These are mentioned in the Jain texts like Ratnakaranda śrāvakācāra''. Some members of India's medical establishment were skeptical about euthanasia due to the country's weak rule of law and the large gap between the rich and the poor, which might lead to the exploitation of the elderly by their families.

Reporters for Reuters observed in 2018 that "The issue is not considered politically contentious in India."

See also
 Thalaikoothal
 Sallekhana

References

India
Death in India
Suicide in India